Philotheca trachyphylla, commonly known as rock wax-flower, is a species of plant in the family Rutaceae and is endemic to  south-eastern Australia.  It is a shrub or small tree with glandular-warty, oblong to narrow egg-shaped leaves and white flowers arranged singly or in twos or threes, in leaf axils.

Description
The ten stamens are linear, tapering towards the tip and hairy.

Taxonomy
Rock wax-flower was formally described in 1855 by Victorian Government Botanist  Ferdinand von Mueller who gave it the name Eriostemon trachyphyllus and published the description in his book, Definitions of rare or hithertoo undescribed Australian Plants. In 1998, Paul Wilson changed the name to Philotheca trachyphylla in the journal Nuytsia.

Distribution and habitat
Philotheca trachyphylla occurs on hillsides and in gullies within forests in New South Wales and Victoria. In New South Wales it is mainly found in coastal ranges south from Braidwood and in Victoria east from the Brythen-Ensay area.

References

trachyphylla
Flora of New South Wales
Flora of Victoria (Australia)
Sapindales of Australia
Taxa named by Ferdinand von Mueller
Plants described in 1855